Emilio González is the name of:
Emilio González Márquez (born 1960), Mexican PAN (National Action Party) politician
Emilio T. Gonzalez, head of USCIS (United States Citizenship and Immigration Services)
Emilio Gonzales III, Philippine ombudsman involved in the Manila hostage crisis

See also
Jorge Emilio González Martínez, Mexican PVEM (Green Ecologist Party of Mexico) politician